Johann Friedrich Walther (14 June 1695 – 29 July 1776) was a German teacher, organist and draughtsman.

Life 
Born in Berlin, Walther was a pupil and teacher at the Garnisonschule in Berlin from 1716 to 1747. In 1716, he also became the school's organist, succeeding Johann Martin Weiß. In 1722, he was entrusted with the organ of the new Garnisonkirche. In addition to his full-time work, he wrote books and added his own drawings to them. He published a first history of the Garrison Church in 1737 and of the Sebastian Church in 1757. In 1747 Walther was appointed chamberlain.

Walther died in Berlin at the age of 81.

Work 
Walther produced numerous drawings and plans that served as models for the leading engravers of his time. His drawings of Martin Grünberg's buildings and other architects in Berlin are well-known.

References

External links 

 
 

German organists
18th-century German educators
German draughtsmen
1695 births
1776 deaths
Artists from Berlin